Ihor Bazhan (born 2 December 1981) is a professional Ukrainian football retired goalkeeper who played for FC Illichivets Mariupol in the Ukrainian Premier League. He is the product of the Zirka Youth School system. He moved to Metalist from Zorya during the 2008–09 summer transfer season.

National team
During the 2002–03 season, Ihor Bazhan was called up to Ukrainian under-21 national football team, where he played one game.

External links
Official Website Profile
Profile on EUFO
Profile on FootballSquads

Ukrainian footballers
Ukrainian Premier League players
FC Metalist Kharkiv players
FC Zorya Luhansk players
SC Tavriya Simferopol players
FC Zirka Kropyvnytskyi players
FC Kryvbas Kryvyi Rih players
FC Arsenal Kyiv players
FC Mariupol players
Association football goalkeepers
1981 births
Living people
Sportspeople from Kropyvnytskyi
21st-century Ukrainian people